Eddie Ladd is a Welsh television presenter and leading dance and performance artist.

Early life and education
Eddie Ladd's birth name is Gwenith Owen. She grew up on a farm near Cardigan, West Wales. Subsequently she studied Drama and Music at Aberystwyth University. She graduated in 1985.

When Owen joined the acting union, Equity, she registered her name as Eddie Ladd because "it sounded quite snappy".

Career
From 1989 she was the "controversial presenter" of the Welsh language television music show Fideo 9 on S4C. She also fronted The Slate (in English) on BBC2.

Ladd was a member of the anarchic performance company, Brith Gof, for ten years. She toured with them internationally across Europe and South America.

She has created her own works and projects since the early 1990s. Her solo show, Club Luz, won an award at the 2003 Edinburgh Festival. In 2005 she was chosen by the British Council to represent the best of Welsh theatre at the Edinburgh Festival, together with No Fit State Circus and Volcano Theatre.

In 2009 Ladd created Ras Goffa Bobby Sands/The Bobby Sands Memorial Race, a 50-minute theatrical piece about the Irish hunger striker, Bobby Sands. The play, staged on a giant running machine, toured Wales. The performance left Wales, with The Independent reviewing her appearance at 'The Place', London. The audio content is in English and Welsh, reflecting Ladd's personal agenda which the reviewer says "at a London performance on an Irish subject, it felt like a different argument". Though the verbal content is difficult to hear, "the movement is strong. Ladd is a wiry, athletic performer, dogged and driven.".

Awards and recognition
 NESTA Fellowship (2001)
 Edinburgh Festival Total Theatre Award (2003), for physical and visual theatre.
 Best Dance Artist, The Wales Theatre Awards (2016).

See also
 List of dancers

References

External links
 

Living people
Welsh female dancers
Welsh television presenters
Welsh-language television presenters
Place of birth missing (living people)
Year of birth missing (living people)
21st-century British dancers